Kala Suri Dona Meraya Denawaka, (20 February 1906 – 9 December 2002 as දෙනවක හාමිනේ), popularly known as Denawaka Hamine, was an actress in Sri Lankan cinema and television. Known as "The grand old lady" of Sinhala cinema, she appeared more than 300 films and teledramas in a career spanned more than four decades.

Personal life
Denawaka Hamine was born 20 February 1906 in Imbulgoda, Gampaha. After completing education from Imbulgoda Vidyalaya, she 
became a teacher at the school.

She had one daughter, Edith Senarath Yapa. She had three grandchildren, all three were involved in cinema. Anura Senarath Yapa who acted in the film Sama. Palitha Senarath Yapa acted in the films Dasa Nisa and Pethigomara. Palitha later became the head of the sports division of the Sri Lanka Rupavahini Corporation. Youngest one, Udaya Bandara Senarath Yapa starred in the film Dandu Monara. Son-in-law Theja Bandara Senarath worked as a supervisor at Yapa Port Cargo Corporation.

She died on 9 December 2002 at the age of 96.

Career
She was by profession a school teacher until a chance encounter with G. D. L. Perera when she accompanied a young actress to a theatrical audition, led to her winning the role of an elderly mother in Perera's play Kandulu. Due to her masterful performance in the role, GDL brought Hamine into his drama group Kala Pela; she would play in Kala Pela productions like Manamalayo, Sakkarawattang and Sama (as Nonnohamy) and was honored with a merit award at the 1964 Arts Council Drama Festival for her role in Totupola.

Hamine's debut film role was in the film adaption of Sama (1965) by GDL reprising the role she had popularized in the play. In Sath Samudura (1968) she played the mother of two fishermen to much critical rave. She was presented a Best Character Actress Award for the role by a special government council. It was delivered on stage by the then Sri Lankan prime minister Dudley Senanayake.

In the 1970s, Hamine had major roles in Tun Man Handiya, Desa Nisa Kolomba Sanniya and Matara Achchi. She continued to perform the elderly woman character. She played to Western audiences with a small role in Indiana Jones and the Temple of Doom as a weeping mother in 1984. In 1987, she was awarded the Kalasuri title. Her best scene in cinema came through Sath Samudura as the mother of Edmund Wijesinghe and Cyril Wickramage who starred in that film. In 1968, she won the Award for Best Actress of the Year for her role in Sath Samudura at the Sarasaviya Film Festival.

Hamine did work in television with roles in teledramas like Kopi Kade in which she made the original cast. In 1998 she received an honorary award for her contributions to Sinhala Cinema from the Sri Lankan president Chandrika Kumaratunga.

Filmography

References

External links

1906 births
2002 deaths
Sri Lankan film actresses
20th-century Sri Lankan actresses
Sri Lankan television actresses